Die Haut (German, 'the skin') were an experimental German post-punk and  post-rock band in Berlin during the 1980s and 1990s, with such records as the Nick Cave collaboration Burnin' the Ice. The only constant member was Christoph Dreher.

Formed as an instrumental rock quartet, many of their recordings and live performances featured an array of international guest vocalists.

Their last full-length album was Spring (1997) followed by a remix album called Springer (1998). At the same time the band went on hiatus, Remo Park and Christoph Dreher have continued to work as separate acts, and Jochen Arbeit with Rudolph Moser joined the Berlin-based underground legend Einstürzende Neubauten.

Membership
1982: Christoph Dreher, Remo Park, Martin Peter, Thomas Wydler, Rainer Berson; Berson left later that year.
1984: Christoph Dreher, Remo Park, Jochen Arbeit, Thomas Wydler, Oliver Schütz; Rainer Lingk joined later that year.
1985: Christoph Dreher, Rainer Lingk, Jochen Arbeit, Thomas Wydler.
1997: Christoph Dreher, Rainer Lingk, Jochen Arbeit, Rudolph Moser.
Guest vocalists live and on recordings include: Nick Cave, Kid Congo Powers, Anita Lane, Debbie Harry, Paul Outlaw, Mick Harvey, Jeffrey Lee Pierce, Blixa Bargeld, Lydia Lunch, Alexander Hacke, Arto Lindsay, Kim Gordon, Cristina Martinez, Laurie Tomin, Alan Vega, Louisa Bradshaw, Danielle de Picciotto, Gordon W.

Discography

Schnelles Leben mini-LP (Monogram 008, 1982)
"Wilde Pferde" (Wild Horses)
"Our Captain Speaking" (vocals: Rainer Berson)
"Spanisches Öl" (Spanish Oil)
"A. Karina"
"Gefährliche Nächte" (Dangerous Nights)
"Ticket Brasil-New York"
"(Never Going Back To) 5th Avenue" (vocals: Rainer Berson)
"Der Karibische Western" 12" (Zensor CM2, 1982), CD (WSFA SF99, 1990)
"Der Karibische Western" (vocals: Lydia Lunch)
"Virginia"
"Die Faulen Hunde Von Tijuana"
Burnin' the Ice LP (Illuminated SJAMS30, 1983; Crown Records CROWN1708; Paradoxx PA5502) — vocals: Nick Cave
"Stow-a-Way"
"Tokyo Express"
"Truck Love"
"The Victory"
"Pleasure Is the Boss"
"Dumb Europe"
"This Flame Will Never Die"
"Fandango" 12" (Megadisc MD125283, 1987)
"Fandango"
"Burn It Down" (vocals: Paul Outlaw credited as John Paul Brasuell)
"Nevada" (vocals: Paul Outlaw credited as John Paul Brasuell)
Headless Body in Topless Bar LP (WSFA SF83, 1988)
"Another Ship in the Night"
"Escape from Yoghourt Ranch"
"S.H.C."
"Indianapolis, Round 69"
"Wheels Over Me"
"I Just Dropped In (To See What Condition My Condition Was In)" (vocals: Nick Cave)
"Sad Dark Eyes" (vocals: Mick Harvey)
"You Seen Angel Jesus?" (vocals: Kid Congo Powers)
"My Gift to You" (vocals: Kid Congo Powers)
"The Bells Belong to the Ashes" (vocals: Anita Lane)
Die Hard LP (WSFA SF91/EFA LP02691, 1989)
"Urge" (vocals: Arto Lindsay)
"P.S.Y.C.H.O."
"Coming Through Slaughter"
"Aischa"
"Garden of Agony (Pt.2)"
"Anschlag!"
"Marodeure"
"Gesprengte Ketten"
"Mean Machine"
"A Shady Haze of Guenther"
"Garden of Agony (Pt.1)"
"Are You Hectic?" 12" by Alert (Die Haut and Blixa Bargeld) (Cash Beat CB17/EFA MCD02817, 1992)
"Perpetual Mobile Mix"
"Eclectic Remix"
"Blackout Mix"
Head On LP (WSFA SF122/Triple X 51148, 1992)
"Intoxication" (vocals: Kim Gordon)
"Don't Fool With the Franchise" (vocals: Alan Vega)
"Burn Crying" (vocals: Cristina Martinez)
"Don't Cross My Mind" (vocals: Debbie Harry)
"Breaking in Your Daydream" (vocals: Jeffrey Lee Pierce)
"Johnny Guitar" (vocals: Blixa Bargeld)
"Excited" (vocals: Kid Congo Powers, Anita Lane)
"Parts Unknown" (vocals: Kid Congo Powers, Lydia Lunch)
"Vandal" (vocals: Lydia Lunch)
"Doggin'" (vocals: Lydia Lunch)
"How Long (Have We Known Each Other Now)" (vocals: Blixa Bargeld, Anita Lane)
Sweat LP (WSFA SF140/Triple X 51184-2, 1993) — live at Berlin Metropol, August 24, 1992, and Apeldoorn August 1992
(side 1) Psycho
"Truck Love" (vocals: Nick Cave, Alex Hacke)
"Anschlag"
"Excited" (vocals: Kid Congo Powers)
"Parts Unknown" (vocals: Kid Congo Powers and Lydia Lunch)
"SHC"
(side 2) Pleasure Is The Boss (vocals: Nick Cave)
"Sad Dark Eyes" (vocals: Nick Cave)
"Aischa"
"Victory"
"Angel Jesus" (vocals: Kid Congo Powers)
"Golden Gate" (vocals: Kid Congo Powers)
"Another Ship in the Night"
"Johnny Guitar" (vocals: Blixa Bargeld)
CD track listing: "Psycho", "Truck Love", "Anschlag", "SHC", "In The Heat of the Night" (CD only; vocals: Kid Congo Powers), "Angel Jesus", "Pleasure Is the Boss", "Sad Dark Eyes", "Aischa", "Victory", "Golden Gate", "Parts Unknown", "Excited", "Another Ship in the Night", "Hand" (CD only; vocals: Alex Hacke), "Johnny Guitar"
Sweat video (WSFA 140V/Triple X 51184-3, 1993) — live video from Tempodrom, Berlin, August 1992, 66 minutes; directed by Rolf S. Wolkenstein
"Victory"
"P.S.Y.C.H.O."
"(You Seen) Angel Jesus?" (vocals: Kid Congo Powers)
"In The Heat of the Night" (vocals: Kid Congo Powers)
"Jenseits Von Eden" (vocals: Alex Hacke)
"Doggin'" (vocals: Lydia Lunch)
"Johnny Guitar" (vocals: Blixa Bargeld)
"SHC"
"Subterranean World/How Long?" (vocals: Blixa Bargeld, Anita Lane)
"Sad Dark Eyes" (vocals: Nick Cave)
"Pleasure Is the Boss" (vocals: Nick Cave)
"Cisco Sunset" (vocals: Lydia Lunch)
"Truck Love" (vocals: Nick Cave, Alex Hacke)
"Little Doll"   (vocals: Nick Cave, Kid Congo Powers, Lydia Lunch, Alex Hacke, Blixa Bargeld)
Spring LP/CD (Our Choice/Rough Trade RTD195.1914.2, 1997) — Thomas Wydler plays only on "At First ... But Then"
"At First ... But Then"
"Blood Meridian"
"Happy Trails"
"Der Still Don"
"P/J"
"Morituri Te Salutant"
"Okinai" (vocals: Laurie Tomin, Louisa Bradshaw)
"Cinema Excessiva" (vocals: Alex Hacke)
"No Go" (vocals: Danielle de Picciotto)
"The Assisi Machine" (vocals: Blixa Bargeld, Gordon W.)
(sign) ("Very Good Friends")
Springer LP (Our Choice/Rough Trade RTD195.3363.2, 1998) — remixes of Spring
"Morituri Te Salutant" (remix by Scanner)
"Okinai" (remix by Atom Heart)
"Cinema Excessiva" (remix by Hans Nieswandt)
"Okinai" (remix by Jim O'Rourke)
"The Assisi Machine" (remix by Deep Space Network)
"Sleepwalker" (remix by Oval)
"Sleepwalker" (remix by Mad Professor)
"(sign)" (remix by Air Liquide)
"(sign)"  (remix by To Rococo Rot)
"At First ... But Then" (remix by Andy Hawkins)
"The Assisi Machine" (remix by Alan Vega)
"Cinema Excessiva" (Hans Nieswandt remix) (Rough Trade, 1998)

Compilation appearances
"My Gift To You" on Sleep? cassette (Heiliger Strohsack Kartell, 1984)
"Nevada" on Berlin Now video, 1985

References

External links
Die Haut Discography (Maurice Maes)
 1982  Die Haut live at Berlin Atonal, SO36 . Photo by Peter Lind
David Sheridan's article on 'Die Haut'' at TrouserPress
Burnin' the Ice review on Dusted Magazine by Emerson Dameron, July 26, 2004

Musical groups from Berlin
German post-punk music groups
Musical groups established in 1982
Triple X Records artists
1982 establishments in Germany